The Croatian Army ( or HKoV) is the largest and most significant component of the Croatian Armed Forces (CAF).

Role and deployment 
The fundamental role and purpose of the Croatian Army is to protect vital national interests of the Republic of Croatia and defend the sovereignty and territorial integrity of the state.

The Croatian Army's primary tasks are to:
 Defend against possible aggression at strategic operational levels and to defend against any land, air, or amphibious assault, in co-operation with the other branches of the CAF.
 Help allies and friendly countries in time of need.
 Build the capability to carry out non-traditional tasks such as humanitarian support during floods, fires, and other natural disasters.

Recent and current operations

North Atlantic Treaty Organisation (NATO) 

The Croatian Army has contributed to the following NATO missions:
 NATO EFP Battlegroups (Lithuania & Poland) - 2017
 Operation Resolute Support (Afghanistan) - since 2015
 NATO International Security and Assistance Force (ISAF) (Afghanistan) - from 2003 to 2014

United Nations (UN) 

The Croatian Army was involved in the following UN missions as of December 2017:
 UN Mission for the Referendum in Western Sahara (MINURSO): seven military observers
 UN Interim Force in Lebanon (UNIFIL): one staff officer
 UN Military Observer Group in India and Pakistan (UNMOGIP): nine military observers

In the past, the Croatian Army has also contributed to:
 UN Observer Mission in Georgia (UNOMIG)
 UN Mission in Support of East Timor (UNMISET)
 UN Mission in Sierra Leone (UNAMSIL)
 UN Mission in Ethiopia and Eritrea (UNMEE)
 UN Mission in Sudan (UNMIS)
 UN Mission in Liberia (UNMIL)
 UN Mission in Cyprus (UNFICYP)

History
The Croatian Army was formed in the Croatian War of Independence, when, on 3 November 1991, the Croatian National Guard was renamed the Croatian Army.

Numerous Croatian army units arose from the Croatian National Guard, including:
 1st Croatian Guards Corps
 1st Guards Brigade (Croatia)
 2nd Guards Brigade (Croatia)
 3rd Guards Brigade (Croatia)
 4th Guards Brigade (Croatia)
 7th Guards Brigade (Croatia)
 Croatian 104th Brigade
 204th Vukovar Brigade

The locally based regiments were named the Home Guard Regiments (Domobranska pukovnija). They were created on 24 December 1991, during the war, and ceased to exist in a 2003 reorganization.

Organizational structure and status
The Croatian Army is an all-volunteer force numbering 7,073 active duty personnel and 151 civil servants and employees as of 2020. The Army can also call on 6,000 reserve personnel who serve up to 30 days every year.

The Croatian Army is being reorganized to fit in the NATO doctrine of a small, highly capable force with an emphasis on mobility and versatility.

Major combatant commands of the Croatian Army are one armored and one mechanized brigade, each brigade having a specific role and different responsibilities. In 2012, one motorized infantry company is to be detached and put under the command of the EU Battle Group led by Germany. Croatia continues to deploy 350 personnel in support of NATO International Security Assistance Force in Afghanistan.

Croatia achieved NATO membership in April 2009. The defence reforms that Croatia initiated in 2000 have a long-term goal of replacing and modernizing the armed forces to meet the challenges of NATO membership. The plan calls for the modernization of the Army and the introduction of training and doctrine in line with Western (NATO) standards. Replacing ex-Yugoslav/Soviet hardware is also one of the main priorities.

There are various ongoing initiatives, such as the upgrade of the tank fleet, introduction of new Armored Personnel Carriers and NATO standard assault rifles, etc. Procurement of new, NATO-compatible equipment takes a significant part of the defense budget.

Until less than a decade ago, Croatia had operated just under 280 main battle tanks, but this number decreased significantly due to the withdrawal of roughly 200 obsolete T-55 tanks in 2006. Most of these units have been scrapped, but a limited number have been stored as operational reserve in case of need. The mainstay now are the M-84A4 Sniper main battle tanks which are currently undergoing overhauls. However, modernization of the tank fleet to the M-84D standard is also envisaged.

In July 2007 Patria AMV won the contract to supply the next generation of APCs to the Croatian Army. Only 84 vehicles were ordered at first with an additional 42 purchased in an extended contract signed in December 2008. Croatia now operates 126 units with the first six vehicles manufactured in Finland and delivered by late 2008. All remaining vehicles have been locally produced by 2014. Out of a total of 126 units, 112 are armed with 12,7 Protector (RWS) remote controlled stations.

In early 2007, Croatia bought 10 Iveco LMV light armoured vehicles at a cost of 330,000 Euros per unit. According to official documents, 94 of these vehicles were needed by 2017. However, Croatia now relies on over 200 US-donated HMMWV and MRAP type vehicles.

Steps have been made to standardize the difficult-to-maintain vehicle inventory of the Croatian military, which is full of various models of different origin, type and age. Starting with 2005, the Army bought 152 light trucks and vehicles, 156 in 2006 with an additional 170 obtained by the end of 2007. All vehicles are from prominent European or Japanese manufacturers including Mercedes-Benz, Land Rover, Iveco, MAN, Toyota and Nissan. These purchases are an ongoing process seen as roughly 150-180 new terrain vehicles are procured annually.

The Croatian Army is introducing a new assault rifle in 5.56mm NATO caliber to replace large stocks of AK-47 and its derivatives. The chosen model is the locally manufactured VHS developed by HS Produkt. The initial batch of 1,000 rifles was ordered in 2009–2010 with the requirement for up to 20,000 rifles. The MoD press and photo releases from regular training activities indicate that the VHS had been issued to elements of the Military Intelligence Battalion, Combat Swimmer Detachment of the Special Forces Battalion, as well as to one of the infantry companies of the Guards Mechanized Brigade as early as 2011.

Due to the conflict in Ukraine and intense regional security it has become apparent current Army organization requires significant re-organization. What this re-organization entails will become apparent in next defence white paper later in the year, however current Defence minister outlined some requirements which includes formation of a 3rd (pricuvne = reserve) brigade which will needed to be fully equipped and ready to be deployed at moment's notice.  Brigade would be medium mechanized infantry brigade, with equipment donated by US and some of the current equipment relegated to a reserve status, this includes older MRAP vehicles, M1151 vehicles which are going to be replaced by newer counterparts, undisclosed noumber of Stryker probably around 120 vehicles, heavier artillery and light anti aircraft systems.

Order of battle

 Army Aviation Wing - (Lucko)
 Land Forces Command (Karlovac)
 Guards Armoured Mechanized Brigade - (Vinkovci)
 Headquarters Company (Vinkovci)
 Tank Battalion "Kune" (Đakovo)
 Armored Battalion of the Guards Armored Mechanized Brigade
 1st Mechanized Battalion "Sokolovi" (Našice)
 2nd Mechanized Battalion "Pume" (Varaždin )
 Mixed Artillery Battalion (Bjelovar)
 Air Defence Battalion (Vinkovci)
 Engineer Battalion (Vinkovci)
 Reconnaissance Company (Vinkovci)
 Signals Company (Vinkovci)
 Logistics Company (Vinkovci)
 Guards Mechanized Brigade - Medium Mechanized Brigade (Knin)
 Headquarters & Headquarters Company
 1st Mechanized Battalion "Tigrovi" (Petrinja)
 2nd Mechanized Battalion "Gromovi" (Petrinja)
 3rd Mechanized Battalion "Pauci" (Knin)
 Motorized Battalion "Vukovi" (Gospić)
 Mixed Artillery Battalion (Karlovac/Slunj)
 Air Defence Battalion (Benkovac)
 Engineer Battalion (Sinj)
 Reconnaissance Company
 Signals Company
 Logistics Company
 Training and Doctrine Command "Fran Krsto Frankopan" (Osijek)
 Command Company (Osijek)
 Infantry Regiment (Petrinja)
 Artillery Regiment (Bjelovar)
 Engineer Regiment (Karlovac)
 River Battalion (Osijek)
 Logistics Regiment (Benkovac)
 Basic Training Centre (Požega)
 Combat Training Center (Slunj)
 Combat Leaders Training Center "Marko Babić" (Udbina)
 Simulation Center (Zagreb)
 International Operations Training Center (Rakitje)
 Military Police Regiment (Ogulin/Karlovac)
 Signals Regiment (Karlovac)
 Military Intelligence Battalion (Zagreb)
 NBC Defence Battalion (Dugo Selo)
 Special Operations Forces Command (Delnice)
 Air Defence Regiment (Zadar)
 Command Battery (Zemunik)
 1st Mixed Battalion (Zemunik)
 2nd Mixed Battalion (Udbina)
 3rd Mixed Battalion (Zagreb)
 Signals Battalion (Velika Gorica)

Training Grounds 
 Eugen Kvaternik Training Grounds (Slunj)
 Crvena Zemlja Training Grounds (Knin)
 Gašinci Training Grounds (Đakovo)

Operational art and tactical doctrine 
Building on NATO's Partnership for Peace assistance programs and full NATO membership since 2009, the Croatian Army has embraced the alliance concepts of the 24-hour, three-dimensional battlefield and the employment of highly trained and motivated forces equipped to deploy rapidly and operate with flexibility as part of a larger multinational force.

The Croatian Army is also working more closely with the air force and navy, resulting in more multi-phased operations with detailed ground/air coordination, but more needs to be done at all echelons to achieve a deeper level of jointness. In all of these activities, the land forces are in the lead.

Equipment

Modernization plans

In past decade or so, Croatian Army underwent significant changes, modernisation of the armed forces albeit at the much slower pace then anticipated due to economic recession at the start of this decade, caused realignment of Croatia's priorities, Croatia's military subsequently faced significant cutbacks and reduction in expenditure or purchase of new armaments. However, as a result of NATO membership, Croatia agreed to fulfill some of the operational responsibilities towards NATO, this includes formation of two mechanised brigades, with emphasis on equipping both brigades with NATO standard equipment.

Procurement of heavy weapons is still lagging behind due to shortage of funding for the armed forces, however donations by the US Armed Forces have helped Croatia to gap some of the shortfalls. Purchase of 126 Patria AMV APCs allowed for light mechanized brigade to replace old Yugoslav and Soviet era weapon systems that saw little use with in NATO. However, the Heavy Mechanized brigade still relies heavily on Soviet and Yugoslav-era weapons systems and modernization of that brigade is one of the priorities for current government. Equipping the brigade with a modern Infantry Fighting Vehicle such as M2 Bradley, would go long way in fulfilling that task. Modernization of Croatia's M-84 main battle tanks due to significant costs but also lack of interoperability within NATO has been dropped and alternatives are being sought, Leopard 2 most likely being the only choice for the armed forces, however lack of funding ensures this remains only a distant dream at this stage.

Current plans call for establishment of a 3rd mechanized battalion with in Heavy Mechanized Brigade due to NATO requirement for such unit. 60 Additional Patria AMV will be ordered to fulfill requirements for Heavy Mechanized Brigade, additional PzH 2000 howitzers are likely to be purchased from Germany to meet the NATO requirement for a 2nd Armored Battalion. Additional light mine protected vehicles to be sought from US, to meet the NATO requirements for ISTAR capability and number of drones and UAVs to be purchased as part of this capability. Army will try to update its current logistics' requirement with a purchase of up to 500 new military trucks, 300 light off-road vehicles and number of other support vehicles. This is likely to take at least a decade due to shortage of funds. Purchase of 30mm RCWS is a priority, 16 of which are already on order, requirement calls for 64 RCWS, this also includes purchase of modern anti tank system for the armed forces to replace current Soviet era systems that are nearing their use date. Army also plans to purchase modern western medium range Surface to air system, with NASAMS 2 being the most likely choice, however shortage of funds might delay the purchase until late 2020s. In the aftermath of Zagreb Tu-122 drone crash, in October 2022, defence minister Mario Banožić announced the acquisition of one battery of short range air defence system of French origin with further aim of acquiring five batteries altogether. Besides mentioning the country of origin, he refused to go into more details, except for saying that the funds for this were already secured.  

The budget should slowly increase due to NATO requirement for all its members to spend at least 2% of GDP on defense. Croatia plans to meet that target by around 2025, by which point Croatian economy is expected to reach around 550 billion kuna or just under $90 billion at current exchange rate. With more funds it is hopped Croatia could modernize most of its armed forces to NATO standard without US assistance by this point. Currently the US has aided Croatian Armed Forces modernization and training in tune of around €120 million per year since 2015 and is expected to increase these slightly in coming years as Croatia is about to purchase UH-60 Black Hawk helicopters and number of other systems.

Other programs:
 Equipping motorized infantry battalion (800-1,000 men) with night vision equipment, including advanced optoelectronics and sensors, ground radars, thermal imaging cameras – 120 million Croatian Kuna
 NBC equipment for biological/chemical-decontamination unit – 150 million Croatian Kuna
 Procurement of new army engineering vehicles, armored recovery vehicles, mine clearance vehicles and armored personal vehicles designed to withstand mine blasts – 320 million Croatian Kuna
 Procurement of modern communication and battlefield management systems –
 Procurement of new logistic and amphibious vehicles – 250 million Croatian Kuna
 Procurement of 3-4 Artillery Radars – 30–40 million Croatian Kuna
 Procurement of 8-12 Mobile air defense radars – 200 to 300 million Croatian Kuna
 Procurement of Army Field Hospital - 80 to 100 million Croatian Kuna
 Procurement of 16 Army Tank transporters, Heavy Equipment Transporters – 80 to 100 million Croatian Kuna
 Procurement of Bridge laying equipment – 100 million Croatian Kuna

See also

 List of Croatian soldiers
 Military history of Croatia

References

Ground Army
Modern history of Croatia
Armies by country